Lydie Polfer (born 22 November 1952, in Luxembourg City) is a Luxembourgish politician who has served in a number of capacities, including Deputy Prime Minister, Minister for Foreign Affairs, and Mayor of Luxembourg City, as well as a Member of the European Parliament (MEP) and a member of the Chamber of Deputies.  She is a member of the Democratic Party (DP).

Early life 
Polfer succeeded her father, Camille Polfer, as mayor of Luxembourg City, when he was forced to resign from the position due to poor health after only two years.  She was first elected to the Chamber of Deputies in the 1984 election, representing Centre.  She was the Deputy Prime Minister and Minister for Foreign Affairs in the government of Jean-Claude Juncker from August 1999 until July 2004.

In the 2004 legislative election, Polfer was elected, once again, top of the DP list, coming second overall to Luc Frieden.  However, the DP polled poorly overall, losing five seats nationwide, and, with them, their position as the second-largest party and kingmakers.  As such, the CSV entered instead into a coalition with the Luxembourg Socialist Workers' Party (LSAP), ejecting Polfer from the government.  The European Parliament election held on the same day also saw the DP lose votes, as well as fall to fourth, behind the Greens for the first time.  Nonetheless, Polfer still came top of the DP list (and third overall), and took her place in the European Parliament, where the DP sit in the Group of the Alliance of Liberals and Democrats for Europe.

She is now once again Mayor of Luxembourg City, after previously being mayor there from 1982 to 1999.  Polfer is a Vice Chair of the ACP-EU Joint Parliamentary Assembly.

See also
 Juncker-Polfer Ministry (1999–2004)

Footnotes

External links

 Chamber of Deputies official website biography

Ministers for Foreign Affairs of Luxembourg
Deputy Prime Ministers of Luxembourg
MEPs for Luxembourg 2004–2009
Mayors of Luxembourg City
Members of the Chamber of Deputies (Luxembourg)
Members of the Chamber of Deputies (Luxembourg) from Centre
Councillors in Luxembourg City
Democratic Party (Luxembourg) politicians
1952 births
Living people
People from Luxembourg City
Women mayors of places in Luxembourg
Democratic Party (Luxembourg) MEPs
21st-century women MEPs for Luxembourg
Female foreign ministers
MEPs for Luxembourg 1989–1994
Women government ministers of Luxembourg
20th-century Luxembourgian women politicians
20th-century Luxembourgian politicians
Luxembourgian women diplomats